Toshio Haru (波留 敏夫, born May 25, 1970 in Kyoto, Kyoto, Japan) is a former Nippon Professional Baseball outfielder.

External links

1970 births
Living people
Baseball people from Kyoto
Japanese baseball players
Nippon Professional Baseball outfielders
Yokohama BayStars players
Chunichi Dragons players
Chiba Lotte Marines players
Japanese baseball coaches
Nippon Professional Baseball coaches